The Smolen–Gulf Bridge is a covered bridge which carries State Road (Ashtabula County Road 25) across the Ashtabula River at the Plymouth and Ashtabula Township line in northern Ashtabula County, Ohio, United States.  At 613 feet (182.9 meters), it is the longest covered bridge in the United States – a title formerly held by the Cornish–Windsor Covered Bridge in New Hampshire – and the fourth longest covered bridge in the world. The bridge, one of 17 drivable covered bridges in the county, was designed by John Smolen, former Ashtabula County Engineer when the idea of bridging the Ashtabula River Gulf with a wooden structure was first conceived in 1995.

History
The county's 17th publicly accessible covered bridge cost approximately $7.78 million to build, and features walkways along both sides. The bridge consists of  pieces of Douglas fir or yellow pine, with hemlock or yellow poplar being used for the siding. The builder was Union Industrial Contractors and Koski Construction.

The old bridge, a steel bridge built in 1949 (National Bridge Inventory number 0430714), replaced the Crooked Gulf covered bridge (number 35-04-01) built in 1867.

The bridge was dedicated the afternoon August 26, 2008, where the name was unveiled. (The county already has a State Road Covered Bridge located along a different "State Road" (C-354) over Conneaut Creek in Monroe Township, which is the reason for the name chosen for this bridge.) The bridge was opened to traffic, following the construction of connections to the existing State Road, the evening of October 7, 2008.

A visitors' pavilion was added to the site in 2010. The smaller Riverview Covered Pedestrian Bridge opened below the Smolen–Gulf Bridge in 2016.

Gallery

See also
List of covered bridges in Ashtabula County, Ohio
West Liberty Covered Bridge in nearby Geneva, shortest drivable covered bridge in the United States

References

External links
Scans of opening day brochure
Images of construction progress

 Includes documentary information.
 "Smolen-Gulf Bridge". Ashtabula County Covered Bridge Festival website.

Covered bridges in Ashtabula County, Ohio
Bridges completed in 2008
Road bridges in Ohio
Wooden bridges in Ohio
Pratt truss bridges in the United States